John Martins (born 7 October 1950) is a Nigerian boxer. He competed in the men's middleweight event at the 1980 Summer Olympics. At the 1980 Summer Olympics, he lost to Peter Odhiambo of Uganda.

References

1950 births
Living people
Nigerian male boxers
Olympic boxers of Nigeria
Boxers at the 1980 Summer Olympics
Place of birth missing (living people)
Middleweight boxers